Blanchette Brunoy (5 October 1915 – 3 April 2005) was a French actress. She was born Blanche Bilhaud in Paris as the daughter of a physician, and died in  Manosque, Alpes-de-Haute-Provence of old age.

Career
Blanchette Brunoy appeared in over 90 film and television productions between 1936 and 1998. She is possibly best-remembered for her roles in such films as Jean Renoir's La Bête Humaine (1938) and Marcel Carné's La Marie du port (1950).

Private life
She was the goddaughter of writer Georges Duhamel. As a young girl she studied acting at the Conservatoire de Paris. Blanchette Brunoy was married twice to both actors Robert Hommet (?–1958) and Maurice Maillot (1961–1968) until their deaths.

Selected filmography

Notes

External links

Blanchette Brunoy at DvdToile

1915 births
2005 deaths
Actresses from Paris
French film actresses
French television actresses
20th-century French actresses
Conservatoire de Paris alumni